Daniel Sincuba (born 3 May 1992) is a South African cricketer. He was included in the KwaZulu-Natal cricket team for the 2015 Africa T20 Cup.

References

External links
 

1992 births
Living people
South African cricketers
Boland cricketers
KwaZulu-Natal cricketers
South Western Districts cricketers